Amphilophus zaliosus is a species of cichlid that inhabits Lake Apoyo in Nicaragua. It is known in the aquarium trade as the arrow cichlid. It is an elongate species in the Midas cichlid species complex. The arrow cichlid shares its habitat with five other recently discovered species of this complex.

Genetic evidence from Apoyo supports a hypothesis that the six known species of the lake evolved via sympatric speciation.

Appearance
The yellow background color, common among the Amphilophus cichlids of Nicaragua, is absent in the arrow cichlid. The background color is silver to greenish gray. Breeding specimens can be entirely black.

Conservation
The arrow cichlid is the only endemic Lake Apoyo cichlid that has been evaluated by the IUCN. It has been rated as Critically Endangered on the IUCN Red List. Among the small body of information regarding populations of the species of this group, four other species may have smaller populations and/or ranges than this fish in Lake Apoyo: Amphilophus flaveolus, A. chancho, A. supercilius, and A. globosus. The final member of the complex, A. astorquii, constitutes about eighty percent of the native cichlid breeding population in the lake.

References

 FishBase (2006) Eds. Froese, R. and D. Pauly. World Wide Web electronic publication. fishbase.org version (07/2006).

External links
 "Mojarras de Apoyo a Museo Smithsonian" (in Spanish)
 "Hallan Nuevas Mojarras" (in Spanish)
 "El Nuevo Charco de Suenos de Darwin" (in Spanish)
 "Video of endemic Amphilophus cichlids in Laguna de Apoyo, Nicaragua"
 Amphilophus zaliosus in its natural habitat

zaliosus
Fish of Central America
Fish of Nicaragua
Taxa named by George W. Barlow
Fish described in 1976